Acayucan is a city in the Mexican state of Veracruz, located in the state's southeast, in the Olmeca region. It serves as the municipal seat for the Acayucan Municipality.

At the 2005 INEGI Census, Acayucan reported a population of 49,945.

References

Link to tables of population data from Census of 2005 Instituto Nacional de Estadística, Geografía e Informática (INEGI)

External links
Municipio de Acayucan Municipal government website
 Acayucan Guide

Populated places in Veracruz
Los Tuxtlas